Molsberg may refer to:
 Molsberg (Germany), a village in Germany
 Molsberg, a hamlet within Nochern, Germany
 Molsberg (Netherlands), a village in the Netherlands